Richard Wang is a male Hong Kong born athlete who has competed for Great Britain and England in sports shooting and Dragon Boat Racing.

Sports shooting
Wang represented England and won a silver medal in the 50 metres free pistol pairs with Paul Leatherdale, at the 1986 Commonwealth Games in Edinburgh, Scotland.

Dragon Boat racing
 Team GB: Bronze medallist in the Senior 1000m at the 2009 IDBF Dragon Boat Racing World Championships  in Prague, Czech Republic.
 Team GB: Bronze medallist in the Grand Dragons 500m at the 2010 EDBF Dragon Boat Racing European Championships  in Amsterdam, Netherlands.

Richard is currently still involved in Dragon Boat Racing and trains with the Typhoon Dragon Boat Club.

References

External links
 Commonwealth Games Federation
 BDA - British Dragon Boat Racing Association
 EDBF - European Dragon Boat Federation
 IDBF - International Dragon Boat Federation
 Raging Dragons

Living people
1947 births
Hong Kong people
British male sport shooters
Shooters at the 1986 Commonwealth Games
Commonwealth Games medallists in shooting
Commonwealth Games silver medallists for England
Medallists at the 1986 Commonwealth Games